Nordau is a surname. Notable people with the surname include:

 Max Nordau (1849–1923), Zionist leader, physician, author, and social critic
 Maxa Nordau (1897–1993), French painter, daughter of Max